Epermenia costomaculata is a moth in the family Epermeniidae. It was described by Reinhard Gaedike in 2013. It is found in Kenya.

References

Epermeniidae
Moths described in 2013
Lepidoptera of Kenya
Moths of Africa